Plagiostropha hexagona is a species of sea snail, a marine gastropod mollusk in the family Drilliidae.

Description
The length of the shell attains 16.7 mm.

Distribution
This marine species occurs in the demersal zone off New Caledonia at depths of 410 m to 420 m.

References

 Wells, F.E., 1995. A revision of the drilliid genera Splendrillia and Plagiostropha (Gastropoda: Conoidea) from New Caledonia, with additional records from others areas. Mémoires du Muséum national d'Histoire naturelle 167: 527-556

External links
 Holotype at MNHN, Paris
  Tucker, J.K. 2004 Catalog of recent and fossil turrids (Mollusca: Gastropoda). Zootaxa 682:1–1295

hexagona
Gastropods described in 1995